Albert Cohen (born June 9, 1932) is an Israeli actor, voice actor, theatre director, singer and accordionist.

Biography
Albert Cohen was born in Sofia to a Bulgarian Jewish family. He attended the National Academy of Music and played at Sofia's National Theatre. In 1949, Cohen and his family immigrated to Israel. Cohen married twice. His first wife, Ruth Menza, a pianist for the Israel Philharmonic Orchestra, died from multiple sclerosis in 1988. They had two sons, Ady, a composer, and Sharon,  a voice actor and translator. His granddaughter Lenny is also an actress. Cohen's second wife, Da'at Levontin, who he married in the early 1990s, is also a pianist.

Cohen has resided in Ramat Gan since 1960.

Acting and singing career
Cohen was part of an IDF musical troupe affiliated with the  Southern Command. He acted, sang and accompanied himself on the accordion. He left the troupe in 1952 and joined a satirical theatre group.
In 1964, Cohen made his debut film appearance in Sallah Shabati starring Chaim Topol. His other film appearances include the 1969 film Blaumilch Canal directed by Ephraim Kishon and the 2005 film To Take a Wife directed by Ronit and Shlomi Elkabetz. Cohen has also made appearances on television. In 1987, he appeared as a guest star on Parpar Nechmad. He is also renowned for appearing in the comic series Zanzouri. He made further guest appearances on Polishuk and Bnot HaZahav.

After 1966, Cohen performed with the Cameri Theatre, acting in adaptations of The Comedy of Errors, Joseph and the Amazing Technicolor Dreamcoat, Pied Piper of Hamelin, The Government Inspector, Les Misérables. Cohen also made appearances at the HaNephesh Theatre and he directed several plays by Anton Chekhov.

Cohen also worked as a voice dubber. He served as the voice of numerous characters in the Hebrew version of Sesame Street. Other roles include Mr. Smee in Peter Pan, Merlin in The Sword in the Stone, King Harold in the Shrek franchise, Toby in Thomas and the Magic Railroad, Dumbledore in the Harry Potter franchise, Anger in Inside Out, Vitruvius in The Lego Movie, Professor Derek Knight in Monsters University, Bulldog in Planes and many more. He also voiced Slinky Dog in Toy Story 4 following the death of Slinky's previous voice actor, Yehuda Efroni. Cohen collaborated frequently with his son, Sharon Cohen on  dubbing projects.

References

External links

1932 births
Living people
Male actors from Sofia
Male actors from Tel Aviv
People from Ramat Gan
Bulgarian emigrants to Israel
Israeli people of Bulgarian-Jewish descent
Bulgarian Jews in Israel
Israeli accordionists
Israeli male film actors
Israeli male stage actors
Israeli male television actors
Israeli male voice actors
Israeli theatre directors
20th-century Israeli Jews
21st-century Israeli Jews
Jewish Israeli male actors
Jewish Israeli musicians
20th-century Israeli male actors
21st-century Israeli male actors
20th-century Israeli male singers
21st-century Israeli male singers